David Wilson (born 30 October 1977) is a Guam sprinter. He competed in the men's 200 metres at the 1996 Summer Olympics.

References

1977 births
Living people
Athletes (track and field) at the 1996 Summer Olympics
Guamanian male sprinters
Olympic track and field athletes of Guam
Place of birth missing (living people)